Amy Joy Rodriguez Shilling (born February 17, 1987) is an American retired professional soccer player who last played as a forward for North Carolina Courage in the National Women's Soccer League (NWSL). She previously played for NWSL teams Utah Royals FC, FC Kansas City, and Boston Breakers, as well as Philadelphia Independence of the WPS. A former member of the United States women's national soccer team, Rodriguez was a world champion in 2015. Currently, Rodriguez is an assistant coach at the University of Southern California’s women’s soccer team.

Early life
Born in Lake Forest, California, to parents John and Lori, She grew up in Lake Forest, California and attended Santa Margarita Catholic High School in Rancho Santa Margarita, California, where she was a Parade All-American in 2003 and 2004 and the Gatorade Player of the Year in 2005. Her paternal grandparents were from Cuba and immigrated to the United States in the 1950s. She has a sister named Lauren and brother named Adam. Her paternal uncle is Francis Rodriguez and former wide receiver for the USC Trojans 1982-83.

In 2005, Rodriguez was considered the nation's top recruit and was named National Player of the Year by Parade Magazine, EA Sports and NSCAA after scoring 17 goals in 15 games for Santa Margarita Catholic during her senior year. She earned local honors as the Orange County Register Player of the Year and Girls Soccer Player of the Year, as well as the Los Angeles Times Girls' Soccer Player of the Year. She was a four-time all-league selection and All-CIF honoree.

University of Southern California
Rodriguez was recruited by and eventually attended the University of Southern California.  She played for the Trojans women's soccer team from 2005 through 2008. She finished her career at USC as the number four all-time scorer and was considered a cornerstone in the team's first-ever NCAA Women's Soccer Championship. Rodriguez holds the school's second career game-winning goal record with 12, is number four all-time in career points with 79, and is ranked sixth in career assists with 17.

During her freshman year, Rodriguez led the team with nine goals, 25 points and four game-winners. She was named Pac-10 Player of the Week and to the Soccer America National Team of the Week after scoring back-to-back game-winning goals in 1–0 wins over Arizona State University and the University of Arizona. She was named the 2005 Pac-10 Freshman of the Year, a member of the Soccer Times All-America Third Team, and was selected to the All-Pac-10 First Team and Pac-10 All-Freshman Team. She was also named a SoccerBuzz Freshman All-American first-teamer and SoccerBuzz All-West Region first-teamer the same year.

In 2006, Rodriguez missed USC's first four games while competing with the United States under-20 national team at the U-20 World Championships. After returning, she started 14 of 16 games and scored the game-winning goal in USC's NCAA first-round upset of Santa Clara. She finished the season with four goals and three assists.

Rodriguez appeared in all 25 games as a junior in 2007, starting in 21 matches on her way to leading the Trojans in scoring and to the national championship. She finished with a team-high of 10 goals along with three assists for 23 points on the year and had three game-winning goals. Her first career two-goal game occurred in the NCAA Semifinals, where she scored twice in the second half to help USC to a 2–1 win and help earn herself honors as the NCAA College Cup Most Outstanding Offensive Player. The same year, she was named Umbro/Soccer News Net Player of the Year and was named to the All-Pac-10 Second Team. She also earned SoccerBuzz Second Team All-West Region and NSCAA/adidas Second Team All-West Region honors. Rodriguez was named to the Soccer America Team of the Week on October 2 after notching the game-winner against then number two Portland. She finished the season ranked sixth in all-time in career points (59), seventh in goals (23), sixth in assists (13) and fourth in game-winning goals (9).

During her senior year in 2008, Rodriguez missed the first three games of the season due to competing with the United States women's national soccer team at the 2008 Summer Olympics, where she won a gold medal. She was USC's top scorer with eight goals (including three game-winning goals) during the season, provided four assists finishing with 20 points. Rodriguez was named a Preseason All-American and was on the watch list for the Hermann Trophy. She was selected to the All-Pac-10 First Team and was an NSCAA All-American Third Team pick.

Club career

Amy Rodriguez played for the Los Angeles Strikers as her club team.

West Coast FC, 2008
Rodriguez signed to play with West Coast FC of Women's Premier Soccer League in 2008.  However, an injury to Abby Wambach propelled Rodriguez to the United States women's national team to compete at the 2008 Summer Olympics.  She never appeared for West Coast FC.

Boston Breakers, 2009
Upon her return from the 2008 Summer Olympics, the new top-tier women's soccer league in the United States, Women's Professional Soccer, made Rodriguez the first overall pick in the 2009 WPS Draft. Her playing rights were assigned to the Boston Breakers.  During the inaugural season, Rodriguez appeared in 17 matches (11 starts, 982 minutes) and scored one goal. The Breakers finished the season in fifth place with a 7–9–4 record.

Philadelphia Independence, 2009–2011
On September 29, 2009, Rodriguez was traded with Boston's first round selection in the 2010 WPS Draft to WPS expansion team, the Philadelphia Independence, in exchange for Philadelphia's first two selections in the 2010 WPS Draft.

During the 2010 season, Rodriguez scored 12 goals and had six assists. She was named the WPS Player of the Month for June 2010. Rodriguez finished third in the league in goals and scored the winning goal in the first round of the playoffs in overtime against the Washington Freedom to send her team to the Super Semifinal. She finished second on the team in minutes played with 2,001. She was named to the WPS Best XI and a starter in the WPS All-Star Game. She was also a finalist for the WPS Michelle Akers Player of the Year Award and was named the Independence's Most Valuable Offensive Player.

During a 2011 regular season shortened for Rodriguez due to her national team duty, Amy played in 10 games for the Independence (starting six) for a total of 641 minutes and tallied two regular season goals. She scored in both of Philadelphia's playoff matches, tallying the second goal in the 2–0 victory over magicJack in the Super Semifinal and the equalizer in the 88th minute of the championship game against the Western New York Flash, sending the game to overtime before Philly eventually fell in penalty kicks.

FC Kansas City, 2013–2017
In 2013, as part of the NWSL Player Allocation, she joined Seattle Reign FC in the new National Women's Soccer League. About a month after the allocation, Seattle announced that Rodriguez was pregnant and would not be available to play for the 2013 season.  She was later traded to FC Kansas City for Kristie Mewis during the 2013–14 off-season, making her debut for the Midwest club in a preseason exhibition match against the Chicago Red Stars.

On August 31, 2014 Rodriguez scored two goals for FC Kansas City in a 2–1 win against Seattle Reign FC, both on assists provided by Lauren Holiday, to help the club win the 2014 NWSL Championship. In 2015 FC Kansas City reached the Championship game once again and Rodriguez scored the game-winning (and lone) goal off an assist from Heather O'Reilly to win the 2015 NWSL Championship. Rodriguez missed the 2016 NWSL season as she was pregnant with her second child.

Rodriguez returned to FC Kansas City for the 2017 NWSL season. In the first game of the season she scored a goal in the 48th minute, however minutes later she suffered a knee injury and was forced to leave the game. It was announced that Rodriguez had torn her ACL and would miss the rest of the season.

Utah Royals FC, 2018–2020
After FC Kansas ceased operations in November 2017, her rights were transferred to the Utah Royals. In February 2018, she committed to joining the Royals. Rodriguez began the 2018 season on the 45-Day disabled list as she was still recovering from her knee injury. On April 20 she made her debut for the Royals and she scored her first goal for Utah a week later on April 28. Rodriguez finished the season with 5 goals, which was the second highest on the team. She signed a contract with Utah prior to the 2019 NWSL season as she was no longer an allocated player by U.S. Soccer.

North Carolina Courage, 2021 
On 22 July 2021, she and $60,000 of allocation money was traded from Kansas City to the Courage for Kristen Hamilton, Hailie Mace and Katelyn Rowland.

International career

National youth teams 
Rodriguez played for several United States national youth teams, appearing in two FIFA youth championships: the 2004 U-19 World Championship in Thailand and the 2006 U-20 World Championship in Russia, as well as the 2005 Nordic Cup in Sweden.  In total, she's played with the U-17, U-19/U-20 and U-21 programs.

Senior national team 

Rodriguez's first appearance for the United States women's national team came on March 11, 2005, against Finland in the Algarve Cup while she was a senior in high school. She earned two caps, playing as a sub against Finland and Denmark.

In 2008, Rodriguez played in 26 matches, starting in 11. She scored her first two full international goals in the first match of the year against Canada and added another against Norway in the Algarve Cup.

She scored six goals with seven assists during the same year, including two game-winners against Brazil in 1–0 victories at the Peace Queen Cup in South Korea and during a friendly match in Commerce City, Colorado, before the Olympics.

2008 Beijing Olympics
By the spring of 2008, she had become a regular as forward, and started four of five games at the 2008 Summer Olympics, where she scored against New Zealand. Rodriguez had appeared in 18 senior team matches going into the Olympics. Rodriguez provided the assist on Carli Lloyd's game-winning goal in the first period of extra time in the gold medal match to clinch the title.

2011 FIFA Women's World Cup
In 2011, Rodriguez started all 18 games she played for the United States and recorded 1,102 minutes of playing time. She scored four goals with three assists. She played in her first FIFA Women's World Cup at the senior level, starting the first five matches of the tournament.

Rodriguez scored one of the biggest goals of her career in the second leg of the playoff series against Italy, pounding in the game-winner in a 1–0 victory on November 27 at Toyota Park in Bridgeview, Illinois. She started both legs of the playoff series and played all but five minutes over the two games.

2012 London Olympics
Rodriguez scored five goals in a 2012 CONCACAF Olympic qualifying match between the United States and the Dominican Republic; the final score of the match was 14–0. Rodriguez's performance set a record for goals scored in a single match by one player in CONCACAF Olympic qualifying, and tied the single-game record for the United States national team. Both records were tied two days later by her teammate, Sydney Leroux, in a game against Guatemala.

Rodriguez was a member of the team that competed in the 2012 London Olympics. She played four matches as a substitute and received her second Olympic gold medal, the gold medal from the 2008 Beijing Olympics being her first.

In 2012, Rodriguez had nine goals off the bench to tie for the second most in United States women's national team history with Debbie Keller.

On December 8, 2012, Rodriguez celebrated her 100th cap with the senior national team during an international friendly against China at Ford Field in Detroit, Michigan. She wore the captain's armband, a team tradition for players in their 100th national team appearance, during the 2–0 win.

2013–2014
In January 2013, Rodriguez announced that she was pregnant with her first child and would miss all of 2013. She returned to the National Team in January 2014 and was named to the 2014 Algarve Cup roster. Rodiguez was named to the roster for the 2014 CONCACAF Women's Championship, she appeared in 2 matches as the United States won the tournament for the seventh time. She appeared in twelve matches in 2014 and scored 2 goals.

2015 FIFA Women's World Cup
Rodriguez was named to the United States roster for the 2015 Algarve Cup, she scored in a group stage game against Switzerland. The U.S. won the Algarve Cup for the tenth time. In April, Rodriguez was named to the final 23-player roster for the 2015 FIFA Women's World Cup, this would be her second time playing in a World Cup as she was also a member of the team in 2011.

At the 2015 World Cup Rodriguez appeared in two matches. She was in the starting lineup for their quarterfinal match against China PR, which the U.S won 1–0. The United States went on to win the 2015 World Cup by defeating Japan 5–2.

2016–2018
In January 2016, Rodriguez announced that she was expecting her second child and would miss the 2016 Olympics. After giving birth, Rodriguez returned to the National Team in April 2017 in a friendly against Russia. After tearing her ACL in a match with FC Kansas City, Rodriguez would miss the rest of 2017.

After recovering from her knee injury, Rodriguez was called up in June 2018 for a set of friendlies against China PR. She was also named to the roster for the 2018 Tournament of Nations, the U.S won the tournament, but Rodriguez did not get any playing time. She was named to the 35-player provisional roster for the 2018 CONCACAF Women's Championship but she was not named to the final 20-player squad.

Retirement
On January 28, 2022, Rodriguez announced her retirement from professional soccer. She also announced that she accepted a position as an assistant coach in her alma mater, the University of Southern California, women's soccer team.

International summary

Updated through 2019-04-22

International goals

Honors and awards

International
Olympic Gold Medal: 2008, 2012
FIFA Women's World Cup: 2015; Runner-up: 2011
CONCACAF Women's Championship: 2014
 CONCACAF Women's Olympic Qualifying Tournament: 2012
Algarve Cup: 2008, 2010, 2011, 2015
Four Nations Tournament: 2008, 2011
Tournament of Nations: 2018

Club
with FC Kansas City
 NWSL championship: 2014, 2015

Individual
 WPS Player of the Month: June 2010
 WPS Best XI: 2010
 WPS All-Star Team: 2010
 NWSL First XI: 2014
 NWSL Championship Game MVP: 2015

Personal life
Rodriguez is called "A-Rod" by her teammates and soccer commentators.

Rodriguez married fellow USC athlete Adam Shilling on October 8, 2011.
On January 29, 2013, it was confirmed that Rodriguez and her husband were expecting their first child. On August 6, 2013, their first son, Ryan John Shilling, was born. Rodriguez, along with her husband, is a devout Christian.
U.S. Soccer announced Rodriguez was pregnant with her second child when they released an article on December 21, 2015 announcing the roster for the next training camp. Their second child, Luke Shilling, was born on July 1, 2016.

In popular culture

Video Games
Rodriguez was featured along with her national teammates in the EA Sports' FIFA video game series in FIFA 16, the first time women players were included in the game.

Ticker Tape Parade and White House Honor
Following the United States' win at the 2015 FIFA Women's World Cup, Rodriguez and her teammates became the first women's sports team to be honored with a Ticker Tape Parade in New York City. Each player received a key to the city from Mayor Bill de Blasio. In October of the same year, the team was honored by President Barack Obama at the White House.

References

Match reports

Further reading
 Lisi, Clemente A. (2010), The U.S. Women's Soccer Team: An American Success Story, Scarecrow Press, 
 Grainey, Timothy (2012), Beyond Bend It Like Beckham: The Global Phenomenon of Women's Soccer, University of Nebraska Press,  
 Stevens, Dakota (2011), A Look at the Women's Professional Soccer Including the Soccer Associations, Teams, Players, Awards, and More, BiblioBazaar,

External links

 
 US Soccer player profile
 Philadelphia Independence player profile
 USC player profile
 
 

1987 births
Living people
2011 FIFA Women's World Cup players
2015 FIFA Women's World Cup players
American Christians
American sportspeople of Cuban descent
American women's soccer players
American Youth Soccer Organization players
Boston Breakers players
FC Kansas City players
FIFA Century Club
FIFA Women's World Cup-winning players
Footballers at the 2008 Summer Olympics
Footballers at the 2012 Summer Olympics
Medalists at the 2008 Summer Olympics
Medalists at the 2012 Summer Olympics
Olympic gold medalists for the United States in soccer
Parade High School All-Americans (girls' soccer)
Sportspeople from Lake Forest, California
Philadelphia Independence players
Sportspeople from Beverly Hills, California
United States women's international soccer players
USC Trojans women's soccer players
Women's association football forwards
Women's association football midfielders
Women's Professional Soccer players
National Women's Soccer League players
United States women's under-20 international soccer players
Utah Royals FC players
Kansas City Current players